The Datsun Type 16 was a small car produced in Japan in the 1930s.  It had a  side valve engine and was offered in several body styles.

Design
The Datsun 16 was almost identical to the preceding Datsun Type 15 and could only be differentiated externally by detailing on the bonnet and changes in the bonnet mascot and Datsun logo. The interior was more sparse than the Type 15.

Drivetrain
The Datsun 16 was mechanically identical to the preceding Datsun Type 15.

Production
The first Datsun 16 rolled off the production line in Yokohama in April 1937 and production continued until the Datsun 17 was released in April 1938.

References

External links
 Original 1937 Datsun catalogue

Type 16
Rear-wheel-drive vehicles
Cars introduced in 1937